The Master of Margaret of York is the Notname of an illuminator active in Bruges between 1470 and 1480.  He owes his name to a devotional book he decorated for Margaret of York, wife of Charles the Bold, Duke of Burgundy.  A large number of his illuminated books were executed for Louis de Gruuthuse. Several manuscripts have also been attributed to his assistants.

Patrons 

The style of this anonymous master was first characterized by the German art historian Friedrich Winkler in 1925.   He was undoubtedly an illuminator working in Bruges.  Although his name is linked to Margaret of York, Duchess of Burgundy and Countess of Flanders, he actually worked much more for Louis de Gruuthuse, Stadtholder of Holland and Zeeland, for whom he painted about fifteen manuscripts, mostly saints' lives and translations of classical works.  The illuminator must have been very close to his patron, because he five times painted portraits or members of his family.  So much so that another art historian, Ottokar Smital, preferred to call him the Master of Louis of Bruges.  He also took orders from Anthony, bastard of Burgundy.

Style 

The style of the master and its application vary according to the subject of the miniature, and according to the importance of the work ordered.  Thus, the characters are more or less detailed according to their importance in the story, some being limited to simple sketches.  The landscapes and the settings are generally not very detailed, and the artist shows little concern with their lifelikeness.  On the other hand, he highlights the action evoked by the text and the main characters by embodied and expressive faces.  His style is often reminiscent of that of Lieven van Lathem.  He doubtless worked with assistants in an atelier, entrusting the decoration and other less important elements to them.

Footnotes

References 

 
 

1470s in art
1470s in the Burgundian Netherlands
Early Netherlandish painters
Anonymous artists
Artists from Bruges
Manuscript illuminators
Place of birth unknown
Place of death unknown
Year of birth unknown
Year of death unknown